Martin Lemay (born March 19, 1964 in Amos, Quebec) is a politician in Quebec, Canada.  He is the Parti Québécois (PQ) Member of the National Assembly (MNA) for Sainte-Marie–Saint-Jacques in the National Assembly of Quebec.

Background
He studied history and sociology at the Université du Québec à Montréal.  He also received a post graduate certificate in public management at the École nationale d'administration publique.

Montreal city politics
Lemay began his political career in municipal politics being a councilor for the district of Sainte-Marie in the Montreal region from 1994 to 1998.  In 2000, he was president of the Ville-Marie borough.  When Pierre Bourque tried to be elected MNA for the Action démocratique du Québec (ADQ), he became leader of Vision Montréal, which was then the Official Opposition party against Gérald Tremblay.

Member of the legislature
In April 2006, he was elected in Sainte-Marie–Saint-Jacques, the former stronghold of Claude Charron and André Boulerice, in a by-election, defeating the Liberal candidate Nathalie Malépart, who was the daughter of former MNA Jean-Claude Malépart.

This was the first election in which the Québec Solidaire party took part. Lemay had received the support of the SPQ Libre of Pierre Dubuc.

At the time of his assembly nomination, Lemay asked Jean Charest to legislate on climate change, trying to benefit from the recent resignation of Thomas Mulcair.  He was named spokesperson on Housing, replacing Nicole Léger.

After his 2007 re-election, he was named the PQ critic for Immigration and Cultural Communities.

See also
 Vision Montreal Crisis, 1997

Electoral record (partial)

External links
 

1964 births
French Quebecers
Living people
Montreal city councillors
Parti Québécois MNAs
Université du Québec à Montréal alumni
People from Amos, Quebec
21st-century Canadian politicians